The Azuis River is a river located Aurora do Tocantins in the state of Tocantins in Brazil. With an extension of only , the Azuis River is considered as the shortest river in Brazil and Latin America and the third shortest river in the world, according to the Guinness World Records.

See also
List of rivers of Tocantins

References

Rivers of Tocantins